Tamia Valmont also known as Tamia (born July 29, 1947) is a French composer and singer.

Biography
Tamia Valmont made her stage debut at the Châteauvallon Jazz Festival with Michel Portal, in France, in 1972. She took then part of various musical trends: improvised music, contemporary music, theater, and discovered affinity with extra-European music.

She was commissioned in 1980 to perform solo at the Paris Festival d'Automne. On this occasion, she started using recording her voice successively on a multi-track tape to create what she called a "solo polyphony", a genre she would keep exploring in her career. In 1979 Tom Johnson wrote an article about her in the Village Voice that lead to her first USA tour. In 1990 she was invited to perform in Japan by composer Toru Takemitsu at the Tokyo Festival.

She collaborated with artists such as Pierre Favre with whom she recorded 3 CDs. In 2009, the writer Nancy Huston cited Tamia Valmont as her inspiration for the main character of her novel entitled Fault Lines.

She started teaching vocal technique and improvisation in 1973. She is currently teaching to professional singers and actors in Paris.

Discography
Solo Albums
1978 : Solo, T Records
1981 : Senza Tempo, T Records
1999 : Les chants de la Terre, Universal Music

Collaborations with Pierre Favre
1983 : Blues for Pedro Arcanjo, T Records-Gemini
1988 : De la Nuit...le jour, ECM
1992 : Solitudes, ECM

References

 The Biographical Encyclopedia of Jazz, Oxford University Press 2007, By Leonard Feather and Ira Gitler, page 221
 Fault Lines, Kindle Edition 2008, By Nancy Huston, Author's Note

External links
http://continuo.wordpress.com/2008/04/21/tamia-pierre-favre-de-la-nuit-le-jour/
http://www.psychedelicfolk.com/Tamia.html
http://www.musicme.com/tamia-valmont/

French women singers
Living people
1947 births